Codium strangulatum is a species of seaweed in the Codiaceae family.

In Western Australia is found off the coast in the Pilbara and Kimberley regions. It is also found around the Philippines but is considered to be rare.

References

strangulatum
Plants described in 2015